My Dog Skip is a 2000 American comedy-drama film, directed by Jay Russell and starring Frankie Muniz, Diane Lane, Luke Wilson, and Kevin Bacon with narration by Harry Connick Jr. Based on the autobiographical book of the same name, the film tells the story of a 9-year-old Willie Morris as he is given a Jack Russell Terrier for his birthday, and how the dog fundamentally changes several aspects of his life. My Dog Skip was released on March 3, 2000, by Warner Bros. and received generally positive reviews from critics. The film earned more than $35.5 million on a $4.5 million budget.

Plot
Willie Morris looks back in the early 1940s and how it was colored by his dearly beloved dog, a Jack Russell Terrier whom he had named Skip. Willie is a lonely boy with a gruff, proud father Jack, a Spanish Civil War veteran, and a charismatic, talkative mother Ellen, a housewife, but he is an only child with few friends. His one companion is a man who lives next door, Dink Jenkins, who is the local sports hero in Mississippi. However, when Dink is drafted to go to war, Ellen decides to buy Willie a dog, against Jack's wishes, in order that he should have some company.

Willie and Skip become firm friends very quickly. However, Willie gets bullied at school by Big Boy Wilkinson, Henjie Henick, and Spit McGee, until Dink sends him a German helmet and belt from the front line. The other boys demand he play ball in order to win back his belongings, while Skip leaps in to help him. That same day, the three boys talk Willie into spending the night in a graveyard, where they claim a witch is buried. If he stays there, he gets to join their gang and also keep the ball Dink signed for them; otherwise, he has to give them his German helmet. Willie stays at the graveyard for a number of hours until he hears two moonshiners Millard and Junior who are loading crates into a crypt. Skip jumps on Millard until Junior comes at him with a spade. Willie slingshots Junior with an acorn and attempts to escape the graveyard with Skip, but they are soon captured by Junior. He threatens to kill Skip unless Willie stays before sunrise. After the two guys leave, the three boys return and accept Willie into their group as a reward.

Skip, having always been a friendly dog, is known by everyone in the town, including black people - significant because Mississippi was still segregated at the time. Skip leads Willie through the best parts of his life; his early days. Thanks to Skip, Willie now has three friends, and a girlfriend, Rivers. Skip is there for him when Dink gets home, shell-shocked and a drunkard since dishonorably discharged from the Army, presumably for desertion. However, when Willie's first ball game comes along, Skip and Willie have their first falling out. Dink agrees to come along, but does not bother because since the war he has found competitions do not interest him anymore. Skip, wanting to cheer Willie up, runs onto the field and sits wagging his tail, refusing to leave. Angry and embarrassed by his poor performance at the game, causing his team to lose, Willie publicly hits Skip across the muzzle and he disappears without a trace.

Unbeknownst to Willie, Skip has returned to the crypt, and has been accidentally shut in the grave where moonshine is being stored. As Willie searches in the graveyard, he hears Skip's barks and runs to save him, but Junior knocks the dog unconscious with the spade. Dink arrives and manages to eject the two moonshiners. As Willie and Dink's families gather in solemnity in the vet's waiting room, Skip nearly dies from his injuries in Willie's arms, but the dog awakens, licking Willie's hands and face.

Willie explains about his friendship with Skip, that he had been an only child and Skip an only dog. When Willie leaves to go to Oxford University in the 1950s, Skip remains with Jack and Ellen, sleeping in Willie's old room, and then dies on Willie's bed: having succumbed to arthritis, he is then buried under the elm tree by Jack and Ellen with Jack telling Willie of Skip's death via a transatlantic call.

Cast
Enzo as Skip
Moose as old Skip
Sweetie as puppy Skip
Frankie Muniz as Willie Morris
Diane Lane as Ellen Morris
Luke Wilson as Dink Jenkins
Kevin Bacon as Jack Morris
Bradley Coryell as Big Boy Wilkinson
Daylan Honeycutt as Henjie Henick
Cody Linley as Spit McGee
Caitlin Wachs as Rivers Applewhite
Harry Connick Jr. as Adult Willie (voice)
Peter Crombie as Junior Smalls
Clint Howard as Millard
Mark Beech as Army Buddy
Susan Carol Davis as Mrs. Jenkins
David Pickens as Mr. Jenkins
Lucile Doan Ewing as  Aunt Maggie
Nathaniel Lee, Jr. as Sammy
James Thweat as Older Big Boy
John Stiritz as Grandpa Percy

Reception
The film opened at #3, grossing $7 million. It ended up grossing $35,512,760 worldwide, making it a major box office success recouping its $4.5 million budget. It also was Warner Bros.' first family film to be a major success since Space Jam in 1996. The film came in at number 4 of Variety's "dollar for dollar" most profitable films of the year 2000. The movie remained in Variety's Top Ten video sales charts for five months after its video release. My Dog Skip won the Broadcast Film Critics Award for "Best Family Film" for the year 2000, Silver Medal Giffoni Film Festival Award, Best Cast Young Star Awards, Silver Angel Award winner, ArkTrust Genesis Award, and the Christopher Award for Best Family Film. It was filmed in the city of Canton, Mississippi; the local visitor's center offers tours showing memorabilia used in the film.
A few blocks away from this museum is the house used in the film (private), with a sign in front saying "Skip's House". The author of the book, Willie Morris, suffered from a heart attack right after the film was completed in 1999. Morris saw a preliminary screening of the film in New York and praised it as "an absolute classic". Morris died a couple of days later and never saw the final version. The film is dedicated to his memory.

Rotten Tomatoes gave the film a score of 73% from 82 critics. The site's consensus states: "Critics say My Dog Skip is cute, wholesome entertainment for the family. It's especially designed to appeal to your sentiment, but you might find yourself choking up just the same."Metacritic gave the film a score of 61 based on 26 reviews, indicating "generally favorable reviews". Roger Ebert gave the film 3 out of 4 stars.

Awards
Angel Awards 2001 

Broadcast Film Critics Association Awards 2001 

Christopher Awards 2000 

Giffoni Film Festival 2000 

Las Vegas Film Critics Society Awards 2000 

YoungStar Awards 2000 

Young Artist Awards 2001

Soundtrack
 "Tuxedo Junction" - Performed by Gene Krupa and His Orchestra
 "Ration Blues" - Performed by Louis Jordan and his Tympany Five
 "Old Yazoo" - Performed by The Boswell Sisters
 "I'm Beginning to See the Light" - Performed by Harry James
 "Hot Time in the Town of Berlin" - Performed by The Andrews Sisters
 "Lullaby of Broadway" - Performed by Richard Himber & His Orchestra
 "Chasing Shadows" - Performed by Louis Prima
 "Moonlight Promenade" - Performed by William Ross
 "Starlight Serenade" - Performed by William Ross
 "The Round Up Prelude" - Performed by William Ross
 "Hop-Along" - Performed by William Ross
 "200 Bright" - Performed by William Ross
 "Washington in the New" - Performed by William Ross

References

External links

Official website

Plot synopsis and gallery from Random House web site

2000 films
2000 comedy-drama films
Alcon Entertainment films
American comedy-drama films
Films about dogs
Films about pets
Films based on children's books
Films based on non-fiction books
Films directed by Jay Russell
Films set in the 1940s
Films set in Mississippi
Films set on the home front during World War II
Films shot in Mississippi
Warner Bros. films
Films scored by William Ross
2000s English-language films
2000s American films